Jordan Skelton (born 22 February 1997) is an English footballer who plays as a defender for One Knoxville SC in USL League One.

Career

College and amateur
Skelton played four years of college soccer at Lander University between 2015 and 2018.

While at college, Skelton appeared for USL PDL side Mississippi Brilla in both 2017 and 2018. Following college, Skelton appeared for PDL, now rebranded as USL League Two, side South Georgia Tormenta 2.

Professional
On 9 August 2019, Skelton signed with USL League One side South Georgia Tormenta.

After co-captaining Des Moines Menace to the 2021 USL League Two title, Skelton signed with USL League One club North Carolina FC on December 16, 2021.

On January 12, 2023, Skelton transferred to League One expansion club One Knoxville SC. The move reunites him with coach Mark McKeever, under whom he had won the 2021 USL League Two championship with Des Moines Menace.

References

External links
 
 Profile at Lander University Athletics

1997 births
Living people
English footballers
English expatriate footballers
English expatriate sportspeople in the United States
Association football defenders
Expatriate soccer players in the United States
Mississippi Brilla players
Tormenta FC players
Des Moines Menace players
North Carolina FC players
USL League One players
USL League Two players
One Knoxville SC players